Southern Myanmar Football Club is a Burmese football club, based in Mawlamyine, Myanmar. The club was a founding member of the Myanmar National League (MNL) in 2009.

The club represents the Mon State, Kayin State and Tanintharyi Region in southern coast of Myanmar. Although it plans to use the Kyaungtha Stadium in Mawlamyine as its home field, it presently shares the Aung San Stadium in Yangon as its home stadium with three other clubs, as the country lacks adequate facilities outside Yangon and Mandalay. Relegated to MNL 2 at the end of the 2014 MNL season.

The club finished in the last place tie with Delta United FC in the league's inaugural cup competition, the MNL Cup 2009. The club appointed Fabiano José Costa Flora as a club manager in May 2017.

In 2017, Kyaw Min appointed as a Head Coach of Southerners and the club finished in 6th position in Myanmar National League. It was the highest league position in their history.

Players

References

External links
 First Eleven Journal in Burmese
 Soccer Myanmar in Burmese
 SMU unofficial fans' blog in Burmese

Association football clubs established in 2009
Myanmar National League clubs
2009 establishments in Myanmar
Football clubs in Myanmar
Southern Myanmar F.C.